White chocolate is a confectionery typically made of sugar, milk, and cocoa butter, but no cocoa solids. It is pale ivory in color, and lacks many of the compounds found in other chocolates such as milk and dark.

History 
In 1937, the white chocolate Galak was launched in Europe by the Swiss company Nestlé. Other companies developed their own formulas, such as that developed by Kuno Baedeker for the Merckens Chocolate Company in 1945.

From about 1948 until the 1990s, Nestlé produced a white chocolate bar with almond pieces, Alpine White, for markets in the United States and Canada. Hershey began mass production of white Hershey's Kisses in the 1990s, a product that diversified during the early 21st century to include a chocolate white-dark swirl Kiss called the Hug.

Composition
White chocolate does not contain cocoa solids, the primary non-fat constituent of conventional chocolate liquor — chocolate in its raw, unsweetened form. During manufacturing, the dark-colored solids of the cocoa bean are separated from its fatty content, as with milk chocolate and dark chocolate, but, unlike with other forms of chocolate, no cocoa mass is added back; cocoa butter is the only cocoa ingredient in white chocolate. White chocolate contains only trace amounts of the stimulants theobromine and caffeine which are present in the cocoa mass but not the butter. Flavorings such as vanilla may be added to white chocolate confectionery. Caramelized white chocolate is called "blonde chocolate" and has a different flavor profile.

Regulations 
Regulations govern what may be marketed as white chocolate: Since 2000 in the European Union, white chocolate must be (by weight) at least 20% cocoa butter, 14% total milk solids, and 3.5% milk fat. As of May 2021, the European Food Safety Authority proposed banning the food coloring agent, E171 (titanium dioxide), used as a common whitener in some white chocolate products.

Since 2004 in the United States, the Code of Federal Regulations defined that white chocolate should contain "not less than 20 percent by weight of cacao fat", "not less than 3.5 percent by weight of milkfat and not less than 14 percent by weight of total milk solids", and "not more than 55 percent by weight of a nutritive carbohydrate sweetener." Acceptable dairy elements when manufacturing white chocolate in the United States include evaporated milk, skim milk, buttermilk, or malted milk. White chocolate products may not contain artificial coloring agents.

See also
 Types of chocolate

References

External links 
 

Swiss chocolate
Swiss cuisine
Swiss inventions